Theodore E. Hancock (May 30, 1847 – November 19, 1916) was an American lawyer and politician. He was New York's Attorney General from 1894 to 1898.

Biography
He was born on May 30, 1847 in Granby, New York to Freeman Hancock and Mary Williams. 

He graduated from Falley Seminary in Fulton in 1867, and from Wesleyan University in 1871. He then studied law at the Columbia University Law School, and graduated as Bachelor of Laws. He was admitted to the bar in 1873.

In 1873, he commenced practice in New York City in the office of Bangs & North. A few years later, he removed to Syracuse, New York, and opened the office of Gilbert & Hancock.

In 1879, he established the firm of Hancock, Beach, Peck and Devine in Syracuse. His son Stewart F. Hancock was considered the "modern-day founder of the firm", and his grandson Stewart F. Hancock Jr. rejoined the firm in 1994 after serving on the New York Court of Appeals.

He was a Justice of the Peace; and was District Attorney of Onondaga County from 1890 to 1892. He was New York Attorney General from 1894 to 1898, elected at the New York state election, 1893, and re-elected at the New York state election, 1895 on the Republican ticket. In 1897, Wesleyan University conferred on him the honorary degree of Doctor of Laws. In 1899, he ran for Mayor of Syracuse, New York.

He died on November 19, 1916 in Syracuse, New York.

Personal life

He was married on June 7, 1882 to Martha B. Connelly of Wheeling, West Virginia, and had three children;

 Stewart F. Hancock (born April 4, 1883) - Graduated from Wesleyan University in 1905 and Syracuse University Law School in 1907. He was admitted to the bar in 1907 and practiced law as a member of the firm of Hancock, Hogan & Hancock.
 Clarence Eugene Hancock (born February 13, 1885) - Graduated from Wesleyan University in 1906 and New York Law School in 1908. Admitted to the bar in 1908 and a member of the firm Hancock, Spriggs and Hancock. United States Congressman for New York's 35th District, 1927-1945. Syracuse Hancock International Airport is named after him
 Martha Hancock - Educated at Syracuse University and Wesleyan College.

References

Further reading
Theodore Hancock b. 30 May 1847 Granby, NY at genforum.genealogy.com Short bio, at Genforum
 Presentation of the candidates for state office, in NYT on November 5, 1893 (erroneously predicting Hancock's defeat)
 The re-elected state officers, in NYT on November 6, 1895
 Election results, in NYT on November 6, 1895
 The honorary degree, in NYT on July 1, 1897
 The run for mayor, in NYT on November 5, 1899

1847 births
1916 deaths
New York State Attorneys General
Politicians from Syracuse, New York
Onondaga County District Attorneys
Columbia Law School alumni
Wesleyan University alumni
People from Fulton, Oswego County, New York
New York (state) Republicans
19th-century American politicians
Lawyers from Syracuse, New York
19th-century American lawyers